The Last Hard Men may refer to:

 The Last Hard Men (film), a 1976 film
 The Last Hard Men (band), a band from the 1990s